Since India and Pakistan gained independence in 1947, the All-India Muslim League  and its successor Muslim League has seen a steady number of splits and breakaway factions. Some of the breakaway organisations have thrived as independent parties, some have become defunct, while others have merged with the parent party or other political parties. The All-India Muslim League was dissolved in 1947 after the partition. Muslim League (Pakistan) was dissolved in 1958 (by martial law).

List of breakaway parties

References

Political schisms

Pakistan Movement